Jérôme Arpinon (born 5 April 1978) is a French professional football manager.

Career
In June 2020, Arpinon replaced Bernard Blaquart as manager of Ligue 1 club Nîmes Olympique.

Managerial statistics

References

External links

1978 births
Living people
Association football coaches
Sportspeople from Nîmes
French football managers
Nîmes Olympique managers
Ligue 1 managers